James William Archer (May 25, 1932 – September 9, 2019) was an American Major League Baseball pitcher who played for two seasons with the Kansas City Athletics. He threw left-handed and batted right.

Archer was eighteen years old when he was signed as an amateur free agent in 1951 by the New York Yankees. He did not make the major leagues till 1961. In between Archer spent seven years in the minor league farm systems of the Baltimore Orioles.

Before the 1961 season began, Archer was part of an eight-player trade that brought him to Kansas City. Archer made his first major league appearance on April 30. He soon became a starting pitcher for Kansas City and finished the 1961 season with a record of 9–15 with a 3.20 Earned Run Average.

Archer pulled a leg muscle in spring training the next year. Favoring the leg, he soon developed tendinitis in his throwing arm. He appeared in just 18 games for Kansas City in 1962. By 1964 Archer was out of professional baseball.

After his playing days were over, Archer served as a city commissioner in Tarpon Springs, Florida. Archer served in the United States Army. He died on September 9, 2019.

References

External links

1932 births
2019 deaths
Kansas City Athletics players
Hawaii Islanders players
Portland Beavers players
Miami Marlins (IL) players
San Antonio Missions players
Knoxville Smokies players
Vancouver Mounties players
Columbus Foxes players
Pulaski Counts players
LaGrange Troupers players
York White Roses players
Baseball players from Virginia
People from Wythe County, Virginia
Military personnel from Virginia
American expatriate baseball players in Colombia
American expatriate baseball players in Canada